Narciclasine is a toxic alkaloid found in various Amaryllidaceae species.

References

Bibliography 
 

Alkaloids found in plants
Plant toxins